"California" is a song recorded by British singer Amelia Lily, released as her fourth overall single. The track was co-written by Lily, Tim Woodcock and Steve Rushton. The track was released on 7 September 2014 in the United Kingdom.

Background
In an interview with the Metro, Lily revealed that the song was about a long distance relationship between a male and female who are constantly flying between London and Los Angeles and keep passing each other. She refused to say whether or not it had anything to do with her relationship with Adam Pitts of Lawson, whom she previously dated.

The single was released via East West Records after Lily signed a new record deal with the label in April 2014. The singer departed Sony Music and Xenomania following the catastrophic handling of her original debut album, which was scrapped and remains unreleased. Lily said of the track, "Life has never been so exciting - I've been busy in the studio writing and recording songs for my upcoming debut album, and 'California' is where we start. I'm so proud to be releasing this music; I have put my heart and soul into writing them. Expect a few surprises along the way though - it's going to be fun!"

Music video
The music video was filmed in Los Angeles, California and directed by Charlotte Rutherford. The male model in the music video is Chris Schellenger from America's Next Top Model (cycle 20).

Track listing

Digital only-single
California — 3:28

Chart performance

The single peaked at a disappointing number 83 on the UK Singles Chart, becoming her first single to miss the Top 40 and the Top 75 altogether. Nevertheless, based on sales alone, the track peaked at number 55.

Charts

Release history

References

2014 singles
Songs written by Tim Woodcock
2014 songs
East West Records singles
Warner Music Group singles
Songs written by Steve Rushton